Portway Park and Ride is a railway station under construction on the Severn Beach line in the Avonmouth district of Bristol, England. It forms part of the MetroWest package of improvements to railways in the area.

History 
The railway through the site was inaugurated on 6 March 1865, when services began on the Bristol Port Railway and Pier (BPRP), a self-contained railway which ran along the north bank of the River Avon to a deep-water pier on the Severn Estuary at Avonmouth. The route was  standard gauge single-track. The BPRP ran into trouble by 1871, when the terminal pier at Avonmouth became difficult to use due to a build-up of silt.

With no prospect of a proper dock being funded without a connection to the national rail network, the Clifton Extension Railway (CER) was approved. The link opened in 1877. Despite the increased traffic the BPRP suffered financially, and was taken over by the CER in 1890. When the railways were nationalised in 1948, the line came under the aegis of the Western Region of British Railways and, upon privatisation, transferred to Railtrack and later Network Rail.

A park and ride was opened near junction 18 of the M5 motorway, adjacent to the railway, in 2002.

Station proposal

In 2009, it was proposed that a railway station should be built. The plan was supported by Friends of Suburban Bristol Railways and the Bristol branch of the National Union of Rail, Maritime and Transport Workers. The plan was approved in October 2012.

In 2017, £2.23million was allocated for construction, of which £1.67m came from the government's New Stations Fund, with additional funding coming from the West of England Combined Authority and West of England Local Enterprise Partnership. Ground surveys began in 2017, with completion originally planned for 2019; however, planning permission was not granted until March 2019. In December 2019, it was reported that the cost estimate had risen to between £3.4m and £3.6m. The station remained part of MetroWest's plan for 2020–2025 and spending of £1.5m was moved to the 2021–2022 year.

Preparation began in December 2021 with vegetation clearance and the setting up of a site compound with the main works commencing in February 2022. The station will have a platform suitable for five-car trains. There will be seven disabled parking spaces by the access point, and parking for 40 bicycles.

The station was expected to be open in the summer of 2022. However, this was later delayed and then again further in November 2022 due to some problems with electrical supplies and cabling. The car park also remained unfinished. The station is now expected to open some time in early 2023, although no firm date has been given.

References 

Park and ride schemes in the United Kingdom
Railway stations in Bristol
Proposed railway stations in England